Ahmet Kayhan Dede (1898, Pütürge, Malatya – August 3, 1998) was a Turkish Sufi master.

Books by Ahmet Kayhan

All books by Ahmet Kayhan were in the Turkish language.

 Âdem ve Âlem (“Man and Universe”) (1989)
 Ruh ve Beden (“Spirit and Body”) (1991)
 Aradığımı Buldum (“I Found What I Was Looking For”) (1992)
 İrfan Okulunda Oku (“Study in the School of Wisdom”) (1994)

These books are anthologies of essays, poems, book excerpts and condensed books. A selection from these in English can be found in Henry Bayman's The Meaning of the Four Books.

Books about Ahmet Kayhan

The Biography of Ahmet Kayhan is written by Henry Bayman: The Teachings of a Perfect Master: An Islamic Saint for the Third Millennium published in 2012 by Anqa Publishing, .

Other books published posthumously about Ahmet Kayhan and his teachings are:

 Hacı Ahmet Kayhan: Sohbetler (Kayhan Berişler et al., 2011, revised and expanded from an earlier 2007 edition). This is basically a transcription of the Master's Friday discourses.
 Ayşe Serap Avanoğlu, Veiled Islam: A Deconstructive Sufi Formation, Unpublished Master's thesis submitted to METU Dept. of Social  Anthropology, 2012. Deals with an educated urban middle-class cross-section of the Master's disciples.
 Henry Bayman, The Station of No Station: Open Secrets of the Sufis (2001) North Atlantic Books. 
 Henry Bayman, The Secret of Islam: Love and Law in the Religion of Ethics (2003) North Atlantic Books. 
 Henry Bayman, The Black Pearl: Spiritual Illumination In Sufism and East Asian Philosophies (2005) Monkfish Book Publishing.

See also

Naqshbandi

External links
 AhmetKayhan.com
 The Flawless Human Being English biography written by Henry Bayman
 Official Website of Henry Bayman Student of Ahmet Kayhan Dede
 The Meaning of the Four Books by Henry Bayman Online Edition

1898 births
1998 deaths
People from Pütürge
Turkish Sufis
20th-century Muslim scholars of Islam
Naqshbandi order
Turkish centenarians
Men centenarians